The Acoustic EP may refer to:

 Against Me! (2001 EP), an EP by Against Me!, also known as The Acoustic EP
 The Acoustic EP (The Early November EP), 2002
 The Acoustics (EP), by Vassy

See also 
 Acoustic (disambiguation)
 Acoustics (disambiguation)